Cumbria is a county in North West England.  It was created in 1974 from the historical counties of Westmorland and Cumberland, together with the Furness area of Lancashire and the Sedbergh Rural District of the West Riding of Yorkshire.  Its largest settlement is the county town of Carlisle.  Buildings in England are given listed building status by the Secretary of State for Culture, Media and Sport, acting on the recommendation of Historic England.  Listed status gives the structure national recognition and protection against alteration or demolition without authorisation.  Grade I listed buildings are defined as being of "exceptional interest, sometimes considered to be internationally important"; only 2.5 per cent of listed buildings are included in this grade.

There have been Christian churches in Cumbria since the Anglo-Saxon era.  Anglo-Saxon elements to be found in the churches include the lower parts of the towers of St Michael, Beetham, and St Laurence, Morland.  Many of the churches have Norman features, including the tower of St Michael, Barton, the north arcade of St Andrew, Crosby Garrett, the crossing of St Lawrence, Crosby Ravensworth, much of St John the Evangelist, Crosscanonby, the north arcade and three doorways of St Mary, Kirkby Lonsdale, and a doorway, the arcades and the chancel arch of St Michael, Torpenhow.  Gothic features are found in churches that originated at a later date, such as All Saints, Boltongate, and in additions to older churches, such as St Lawrence, Appleby, St Michael, Burgh by Sands, and Carlisle Cathedral.  St James, Whitehaven, is in Georgian style, as is the nave of St Andrew, Penrith.  Gothic Revival features can be found in churches that were restored or altered during the 19th century, and include the north transept added to St Michael, Muncaster by Anthony Salvin, additions to St Martin, Bowness-on-Windermere by Paley and Austin, and William Butterfield's restoration of St Bridget, Brigham.  The most modern church in the list is St Martin, Brampton, which was built between 1874 and 1878, and is the only church designed by Philip Webb, using a variety of architectural styles.

Cumbria is predominantly rural, and has the largest national park in England and Wales, the Lake District. The county's major industry is tourism, but there is also some manufacturing, especially in the coastal towns of Barrow-in-Furness and Whitehaven.  The geology of the county is complex: the central Lake District region contains volcanic and metamorphic rocks, with sedimentary rocks around the periphery.  The building materials used for the churches are mainly the sedimentary rocks of sandstone and limestone, with roofs in metamorphic slate. Stone from the nearby Roman Hadrian's Wall was re-used in the construction of some churches in the north of the county, including St Andrew, Aikton, St Michael, Burgh by Sands, and St Peter, Kirkbampton.  Viking material in the form of statues and the Gosforth Cross is found in association with St Mary, Gosforth, and in a wall of St Mary and St Michael, Great Urswick, is a cross-shaft thought to be Viking in origin.  Because of Cumbria's proximity to Scotland, several churches incorporate defensive features, including St Michael, Burgh by Sands, St Mungo, Dearham, St James, Great Ormside, and St John, Newton Arlosh.  This list consists of the 49 Grade I listed ecclesiastical buildings in the ceremonial county of Cumbria, as recorded in the National Heritage List for England.

Churches

References
Citations

Sources

 
Cumbria
 
Lists of Grade I listed buildings in Cumbria